Matías Ramírez may refer to:

 Matías Ramírez (footballer, born 1996), Chilean forward
 Matías Ramírez (footballer, born 1999), Argentine forward